Ceroxys munda is a species of picture-winged fly in the genus Ceroxys of the family Ulidiidae found in Hungary, Slovakia, the Czech Republic, Ukraine, and Russia.

References

munda
Insects described in 1868
Diptera of Europe
Taxa named by Hermann Loew